Towei (Towe) is a Western Pauwasi language of West New Guinea. It is spoken in Towe Hitam village, Towe District, Pegunungan Bintang Regency.

References

Wambaliau, Theresia. 2004. Draft Laporan Survei pada Bahasa Towe di Papua, Indonesia [Draft Survey Report on the Towe Language in Papua, Indonesia]. Manuscript. SIL International.

Tebi–Towe languages
Languages of western New Guinea